Florian Quintilla (born 20 October 1987) is a French former professional rugby league footballer. He played for Catalans Dragons in the Super League and for Toulouse Olympique in the Co-operative Championship. He is now playing for Lézignan Sangliers in the Elite One Championship.

Quintilla named in the France training squad for the 2008 Rugby League World Cup. He was not selected to play.

References

External links
Super League profile

1987 births
Living people
French people of Spanish descent
French rugby league players
People from Narbonne
Rugby league second-rows
Sportspeople from Aude
Catalans Dragons players
Toulouse Olympique players